World Bicycle Relief is an international, non-profit organization based in Chicago, IL that specializes in large-scale, comprehensive bicycle distribution programs to aid poverty relief in developing countries around the world. Their programs focus primarily on education, economic development, and health care. As of February 2020, World Bicycle Relief has distributed 500,000 bicycles in 21 countries and trained more than 2,300 bicycle mechanics in the developing world.
 Within their largest program, the Bicycles For Educational Empowerment program, nearly 70 percent of the student bicycles are designated for girl students.

Background
Studies done in Africa (Uganda and Tanzania) and Sri Lanka on hundreds of households have shown that a bicycle can increase the income for families by as much as 35%. Transport, if analyzed for the cost-benefit analysis for rural poverty alleviation, has given one of the best returns in this regard. For example, road investments in India were a staggering 3-10 times more effective than almost all other investments and subsidies in rural economies in the 1990s. What a road does at a macro level to increase transport, the bicycle supports at the micro level. The bicycle, in that sense, can be one of the best means to eradicate poverty in developing nations.

World Bicycle Relief was founded in 2005 by SRAM co-founder and Executive Vice President F.K. Day following the December 2004 Indian Ocean tsunami. Day and his wife, documentary photographer Leah Missbach Day, travelled to Sri Lanka to witness local relief efforts. In discussions with aid groups on the ground, they realized the potential value a bicycle distribution program could provide, and thus created World Bicycle Relief.  World Bicycle Relief then partnered with World Vision and a local manufacturer to produce and distribute bicycles specially designed to fit the needs and terrain of the recipients, a format that they would later use with other projects.

World Bicycle Relief has fundraising entities in the United States, Canada, Germany, United Kingdom, Switzerland and Australia.

Key features

Specially-Designed Bicycles
World Bicycle Relief designs bicycles specific to the environment in which they will be distributed. The WBR bicycle is branded as the Buffalo Bicycle given its strength and durability. The WBR Buffalo has a coaster brake for safety and durability, and weighs , including a rear rack and fenders. The frame and fork are built from over-sized, 16-gauge steel, and the wheels have 32 and 40 13-gauge spokes, front and rear respectively, with 18-gauge steel rims. The bicycles are assembled in three WBR facilities in Africa—one in Harare, Zimbabwe, one in Lusaka, Zambia, and one in Kisumu, Kenya—to lower costs, be close to the end-user, and to ensure local parts compatibility.

Mechanic training
To ensure ongoing maintenance of bicycles, World Bicycle Relief implemented a maintenance training program.  WBR conducts trainings in groups of 5 - 20 - trainings consisting of a curriculum that encompasses bicycle maintenance, business principles and life skills. Additionally, mechanics are supplied with high quality bicycle tools and uniforms.  Through February 2020, 2,300 mechanics have been trained and equipped to maintain bicycles in their communities in Zambia, Zimbabwe, Kenya and Uganda.  Additionally, World Bicycle Relief is working with interested mechanics to establish their business with a supply of spare parts to help increase the parts supply in rural sub-Saharan Africa.

Projects

Bicycles For Educational Empowerment Program (BEEP)
Launched in June 2009, the Bicycles for Educational Empowerment Program (BEEP) is an educational initiative in partnership with the Zambian Ministry of Education, community-based organizations and several international NGOs. Its goal is to provide 50,000 bicycles to school children and teachers in rural districts in Zambia in order to improve access to education by cutting down travel time. 70% of these bicycles are allocated to students, while 30% are for teachers, community leaders, and bicycle mechanics. 70% of student bicycles are allocated to girl students in recognition of their unique challenges in accessing education, such as having household chores, issues of safety, and prospects of early marriages. Early reports on the program show an increase in the percentage of children who complete their schooling to 88% in BEEP schools compared to the national average of 60%. Every recipient receives basic training about bicycle maintenance and safety, and signs a contract of commitment when receiving his or her bike.

Project Zambia
From 2006-2009, World Bicycle Relief partnered with RAPIDS (Reaching HIV/AIDS Affected People with Integrated Development and Support), a USAID-funded, World Vision-led coalition of relief organizations, to address the HIV/AIDS crisis in Zambia by providing 23,000 bicycles to community home-based care volunteers, disease prevention educators and vulnerable households.  The bicycles provided allowed RAPIDS  not only to serve greater numbers, it also facilitated a greater level of care given to those who were being served, since workers were able to have more frequent visits and also have more significant impact through.  
their interaction with the chronically ill. Among the quantitative outcomes of this program is the finding that since World Bicycle Relief's participation in RAPIDS, caregiver retention has risen to 97%, a marked increase from earlier stages. World Bicycle Relief also trained over 470 mechanics.

A key element of this program is the "culturally appropriate" bicycle, specially designed to meet the needs of the local populations and to withstand the African terrain.

Project CHAI
World Bicycle Relief, in support of CHAI (Clinton Foundation HIV/AIDS Initiative), provided 300 bicycles to people across Rwanda, Kenya, Ethiopia, Mozambique, Tanzania, and Lesotho to help specific HIV/AIDS initiatives in Africa. The bicycles were provided to healthcare workers addressing the medical needs of people living with HIV/AIDS, mentors working with orphans and vulnerable children, and educators teaching disease prevention.

Disaster Relief
In partnership with World Vision, Trek Bicycle and local government, World Bicycle Relief provided 24,3676 bicycles in Sri Lanka to men, women and children in greatest need following the 2004 Indian Ocean tsunami. The selection process included basic economic and commercial needs, distance to work, and distance to schools. An independent report found that nearly 90% of the bike recipients used their bicycles to earn a livelihood.

World Bicycle Relief has also provided bicycles to relief organizations working in Kenya to combat the 2011 famine in the Horn of Africa.

Microfinance and Social Enterprise Initiatives
World Bicycle Relief has also partnered with a variety of microfinance institutions to allow the sale of the WBR bike (The commercial version of their specially designed bike is called the "Buffalo Bike".) to individuals who cannot afford to purchase the bicycle in a one-time transaction.

One example of their microfinance work can be seen at the Magoye Milk Co-operative, a small organization of Zambian dairy farmers established by Land O'Lakes, Inc. Here, 299 farmers use  Buffalo Bicycles purchased from World Bicycle Relief to transport their dairy to the central depot, where the milk is collected and transported to a dairy processing factory. The acquisition of these bicycles has allowed the farmers to increase their carrying potential while reducing the time (crucial when transporting milk) and money farmers need to spend on delivering their product each day.

Many non-governmental organizations and other aid organizations addressing various issues have relied on World Bicycle Relief's expertise in bicycle design.  As a result, many organizations have bought WBR bicycles to meet their specific goals. These organizations include UNICEF (Zimbabwe), CARE (Kenya), World Vision (Mozambique), Catholic Relief Services (Zambia), Wellshare International (Uganda), and the World Food Programme (Southern Sudan).   By partnering with these groups, World Bicycle Relief has become a more sustainable organization.

See also 
 Baisikeli Ugunduzi
 Bikes Not Bombs
 Bikes to Rwanda
 BikeTown Africa
 Cardboard bicycle
 Pedaling to Freedom
 With My Own Two Wheels

References 

Charities based in Illinois
Cycling organizations
International transport organizations